Malikaa is a 2017 Maldivian romantic drama film directed by Ali Musthafa. Produced by Malla Nasir and Ibrahim Rasheed under ES Entertainment, the film stars Mohamed Jumayyil, Fathimath Azifa, Ali Azim and Nuzuhath Shuaib in pivotal roles. The film was released on 2 March 2017.

Cast 
 Mohamed Jumayyil as Munaaz
 Nuzuhath Shuaib as Malikaa
 Fathimath Azifa as Jeeza
 Ali Azim as Hassan
 Mariyam Shakeela as Salma
 Ahmed Shakir as Hussen
 Neena Saleem as Badhoora
 Ismail Zahir as Naseem
 Ahmed Asim as Ismail
 Sujeetha Abdulla as Fairooza
 Ali Farooq as Munaaz Father
 Mohamed Waheed 
 Mohamed Afrah as Doctor

Release and reception 
The film was released on 2 March 2017.

Soundtrack

Accolades

References

2017 films
2017 romantic drama films
Maldivian romantic drama films